Man Maw  is a village in Bhamo Township in Bhamo District in the Kachin State of north-eastern Burma.

History 

Wanmaw (Bhamo) was the name and capital (royal seat) of a relatively major one of the petty Shan (ethnic Tai) principalities, ruled by a saopha (Burmese: sawbwa; Shan-prince of the highest rank), since that state was founded in 1470 until its annexation in 1772 by the Ava-based kingdom of Burma, which had occupied it previously in 1669-1685 and 1767–1770.

See also 
 List of rulers of Shan states

Sources 
 WorldStatesMen - Burma/Myanmar - Shan&Karen states (which lists the last rulers)

References

External links 
 Satellite map at Maplandia.com

Populated places in Kachin State
Bhamo Township